Lux Perpetua is a Polish power metal band founded in 2003 by Paweł Zasadzki, Tomasz Sałaciński, and Emil Łazarski.

History 
The band was founded in 2009 in Podkowa Leśna by Paweł Zasadzki. After recording some songs (including "The Legend" and "An Old Bard"), the band started playing their first shows. Lux Perpetua recorded their first EP, Forever We Stand, in Red Yeti Studio and released it in 2014. Marcin Rykiel and Emil Łazarski later left the band, and Artur Rosiński joined as their new vocalist. The group then began recording their debut album, The Curse of the Iron King, in HZ Studio near Warsaw.

In the meantime, the band signed an agreement with Insignis Publishing Company to perform a song and record a video for Robert J. Szmidt's book Wieża. The video and song ("Pociąg do Piekła Bram" - Polish version of the song "Straight back to hell") were released on YouTube in May 2016.

On February 28, 2017, the band released their debut album. In Poland itself, public interest grew within a few days after the release so much that even a TV station decided to send a film crew to their release show, which happened (due to other appointments) a few days after the official album release. A part of this show can still be seen on Telewizja Żyrardowska.

Musicians 
Current members
 Artur "RooZ" Rosiński - Vocals 
 Paweł "Kaplic" Zasadzki - Percussion, Compositions  
 Mateusz Uściłowski - Guitar 
 Patryk Makać - Guitar
 Krzysztof "Kormak" Rutkowski - Bass

Former members
 Marcin "Martinez" Rykiel - Vocals (EP Forever We Stand - 2014)
 Emil "Kosa" Łazarski - Guitar
 Marcin "Draken" Nieznański - Bass
 Krystian Kowalski - Keyboards
 Magdalena "Meg" Tararuj - Keyboards 
 Tomasz "Tommy" Sałaciński - Guitar

Discography

Video clips

Public appearances 
Over the years Lux Perpetua performed several shows as supporting act for well-known Artists like Skiltron and Hunter as well as miscellaneous festivals like Folk Metal Crusade or Metal End of Summer. 
Further they played a show at a charity performance for battered animals.

References

External links
Lux Perpetua on Facebook

Polish power metal musical groups
Polish heavy metal musical groups
Musical groups established in 2009